The United States competed at the 1956 Winter Olympics in Cortina d'Ampezzo, Italy.

As Squaw Valley would be hosting the following Winter Olympics, an American segment was performed at the closing ceremony.

Medalists 

American figure skaters swept the men's singles competition, taking all three medals.
The following U.S. competitors won medals at the games. In the by discipline sections below, medalists' names are bolded. 

| width="78%" align="left" valign="top" |

| width=22% align=left valign=top |

Alpine skiing

Men

Women

Bobsleigh

Cross-country skiing

Figure skating

Individual

Mixed

Ice hockey

Summary

First round
Top two teams advanced to Medal Round.

Czechoslovakia 4-3 USA
USA 4-0 Poland

Medal round

USA 7-2 Germany (UTG)
USA 4-1 Canada
USA 6-1 Sweden
USSR 4-0 USA
USA 9-4 Czechoslovakia

Nordic combined

Ski jumping

Speed skating

References

Official Olympic Reports
 
 Olympic Winter Games 1956, full results by sports-reference.com

Nations at the 1956 Winter Olympics
1956
Oly